The Sri Lankan Railways M9 locomotive is a mainline 6 axle Co'Co' diesel electric locomotive built by Alstom (manufacturers code AD 32C) and imported in 2000 for the Sri Lanka Railways.

The locomotives initially had both electrical and mechanical problems, and several were out of service for several years. In 2010 the process of returning the fleet to service began.

History

Ten units were ordered in 1997 and delivered in 2000, costing 190 million Sri Lankan rupees each. By 2010 only 3 were in operation due to technical problems, Various problems were described including engine malfunction, and problems with the engine control units, as well as the machines requiring modifications for use on curving track.

The delay in returning the locomotives to service was ascribed to an unaffordability of spare parts, and prohibitive cost of work by foreign firms.

The first of the 7 inoperative locomotives, number 869, was returned to service after 6 years in September 2010, following work by the Arthur C. Clarke Institute for Modern Technologies (ACCIMT) and the Industrial Technology Institute (ITI).

Operation
M9s were not allowed on line above Nawalapitiya, Kelani Valley Line and Matale line.

See also 
 Locomotives of Sri Lanka Railways
 Sri Lanka Railways
 Sri Lanka Railways

References

M09
Alstom Prima diesel locomotives
5 ft 6 in gauge locomotives